Abkureh (also Romanized as Ābkūreh) is a village in Kuhmareh Rural District, Kuhmareh District, Kazerun County, Fars Province, Iran. At the 2006 census, its population was 26.

References 

Populated places in Kazerun County